Walter Bede Dally Haddock (1890–1972) was a pioneer Australian rugby league footballer who played in the 1910s and 1920s.

Playing career
Walter 'Fisho' Haddock played 13 seasons of first grade rugby league in Sydney. He started his career at the Annandale club, playing four seasons between 1910–1913. He then shifted to the Newtown club for two seasons (1914-1915) before returning to Annandale for four more years between 1916-1920, and he became Annandale's longest serving first grade player. When the Annandale club folded in 1920, Haddock played out his career at Glebe for three years before retiring in 1923.

Haddock played for New South Wales on four occasions in 1912 and 1913. He also represented Sydney(Metropolis) on three occasions in 1913,1914 and 1919.
 
Haddock died on 9 September 1972, aged 81 late of Punchbowl, New South Wales.

References

1890 births
1972 deaths
Annandale rugby league players
Australian rugby league players
Glebe rugby league players
Newtown Jets players
New South Wales rugby league team players
Rugby league second-rows
Rugby league hookers
Rugby league players from New South Wales
Date of birth missing